The Cotton Industry (Reorganisation) Act 1936 was an Act of Parliament in the United Kingdom which introduced a compulsory levy on cotton machinery. The proceeds from this levy were used to scrap surplus spindles.

See also
 Cotton Industry (Reorganisation) Act 1939
 Cotton Industry Act 1959

References

Cotton industry in England
1930s economic history
History of the textile industry in the United Kingdom
United Kingdom Acts of Parliament 1936